Anne Chapman ( 1922–2010) was a Franco-American ethnologist.

Ann, Anne or Anna Chapman or similar may also refer to:

 Anna Chapman (born 1982), Russian agent arrested in the US in 2010
 Anne Maria Chapman (1791–1855), New Zealand missionary
 Annie Chapman (1840–1888), British victim of Jack the Ripper
 Ann Chapman (1937–2009), New Zealand limnologist and the first woman to lead a scientific expedition to Antarctica